Buchardt is a German surname. Notable people with the surname include:

Arthur Buchardt (born 1948), Norwegian businessman
Friedrich Buchardt (1909–1982), Baltic German SS officer and MI6 agent

See also
Buchard
Buzhardt

German-language surnames